The 2018 Canada Post strikes were a series of rotating strikes against Canada Post by members of the Canadian Union of Postal Workers (CUPW). Strikers sought "better pay, more job security and minimum guaranteed hours." In November 2018, Justin Trudeau's government passed Bill C-89, which ended the strike and mandated the postal workers return to work. CUPW members continued to work without a contract until September 2021, when they ratified a two-year agreement.

References

Postal strikes
2018 labor disputes and strikes
Canada Post
Canadian Union of Postal Workers
Labour disputes in Canada